Applixware is a suite of proprietary modular applications for Linux edited by Vistasource, Inc.

Applixware was originally created by Applix, Inc.

Alis

Applix's first office suite, introduced in 1986, was called Alis, and was marketed with Alice in Wonderland themed promotional items. One such was a mug depicting the tea party scene from the book, with a Cheshire Cat that disappeared when the mug was filled with a hot beverage.

Alis was available for Unix workstations from Digital Equipment Corporation, Sun Microsystems and others. Two site licenses were sold for Digital's VMS operating system, one to Exxon and one to a brokerage in New York City.

In addition to providing a graphical office suite environment with a number of modules including word processing functions, very advanced for the time, Alis was distinguished by a very powerful scripting language called "ELF", which was capable of, for example, reading spreadsheet data, performing calculations on it, and merging results into text documents.

Aster*x and Applixware
Applixware's next major project was called Aster*x but was renamed to Applixware to avoid confusion with Asterix the comic book hero. Applixware was a suite of office tools consisting of four major components: a WYSIWYG word processor, an email client, a spreadsheet editor, and a database program. It also included a scripting language that allowed users to customize its functionality, and even add new components or programs. During the mid-1990s, Applixware was one of a small number of office suites available for Unix systems. Competitors included products from Island Software and proprietary software from the computer hardware companies.

In the late 1990s, Linux began to emerge as a desktop operating system, and Applixware was ported to Linux, becoming the first graphical office suite for the platform. Sales expanded to the point where Applixware was available across the USA as shrink-wrapped software on retail shelves at stores like CompUSA and Microcenter.

A subset of Applixware modules for Linux was originally developed by Applix upon request from Red Hat, who sold the package for $500.  This price was reduced to $200 in October 1996, and, by 2000, during the dotcom bubble, the Applixware Words word processor was available for $50 in GTK toolkit versions (Applixware 5.0 and Anyware 2.2) while the full Applix Office suite was sold for US$99. Anywhere Office was built as a Java application that could run on in any Java virtual machine. These offers (and the GTK toolkit) were subsequently abandoned when the dotcom bubble burst, and priority was given back to versions aimed at Vistasource's core customers in financial, defense and government markets.

While not the first graphical word processor for Linux (EZ Word, part of the Andrew User Interface System, has that honor), nor the first proprietary word processor for Linux (WordPerfect was first made available for Linux by Caldera in late 1995), Applixware Words was a good deal more user-friendly than EZ Word and a good deal more bug-free than early Linux releases of WordPerfect. 

In 1999, Sun Microsystems bought a competing product, StarOffice, and turned it into the open source OpenOffice.org software suite. That destroyed the market for the competing software, and Applixware sales declined.

The Applixware Words module waned in popularity among Linux users when full-featured open-source word processors, such as OpenOffice.org and AbiWord, became available. Although Applixware was less powerful than the newer office packages, its interface design was arguably superior. While OpenOffice.org tried to make the user experience to be similar to that of Microsoft Office, Applixware was different. Almost no user interface panel was implemented as a modal window. All control elements could be opened by the user and if a control panel was not applicable in the current context, it just made all its widgets inactive. Although a non-modal interface design significantly increases the complexity of the program, it also makes the GUI to feel more responsive to the user. In addition, Applixware's charting capabilities remarkably surpassed that of the Charts in OpenOffice.org 1.x and 2.x versions. Some graphics features were also much more advanced than what the Draw module in OpenOffice.org is capable of. Another feature of Applixware was its small resource requirements; it ran in a satisfactory manner even on low-end machines of the time.

Applixware version 6.1 was released on May 6, 2009.

After OpenOffice
Applix Inc. began to seek other software markets, leveraging the power of their scripting engine and flexible architecture to expand into business intelligence software markets such as OLAP. Applix focused its efforts in developing and its OLAP server TM1 shortly before it was acquired by Cognos in 2007, which was in turn acquired by IBM four months later. Applixware is often used in the industrial world as a means of developing large scale Unix and Linux applications and glueing together other applications.

The Applixware unit of the company was renamed Vistasource, Inc. and sold to Parallax Capital partners in 2001.

Vistasource now offers a freely available limited version for home users on Linux.

Further reading 

 Applix Inc. (1996). Applixware: office suite for Linux. Indianapolis, IN: Macmillan. .
Williamson, Heather (2000). Applixware for Linux Bible. Foster City, CA: IDG Books Worldwide. .

References

External links 
Vistasource Web site
Parallax Capital Partners
Linux Journal - Office Wars: Applixware and StarOffice

Office suites for Linux